Daimler Truck AG (holding company legal name Daimler Truck Holding AG) is one of the world's largest commercial vehicle manufacturers, with over 35 main locations worldwide and approximately 100,000 employees. Daimler Truck AG is headquartered in Leinfelden-Echterdingen, Germany. It was part of Daimler AG from November 2019 to December 2021.

History 
Daimler Truck was established in 2019 as a subsidiary of Daimler AG. In February 2021, Daimler said it planned to spin off Daimler Truck into a separate listed company. The spin-off was approved by its shareholders on 1 October 2021. Following this, Daimler Truck Holding AG was incorporated to manage assets owned by Daimler Truck AG, and Daimler AG retained 35% of shares in a new company, with 5% being transferred to its pension trust. A separate website of Daimler Truck company was launched on 1 December, and the company went public on 10 December.

Brands 
 Mercedes-Benz: light, medium and heavy trucks, buses
 Freightliner: medium and heavy trucks, vans
 Western Star: heavy trucks
 Fuso: light, medium and heavy trucks, buses
 Thomas Built Buses: school buses
 Setra: buses
 BharatBenz: Truck brand in India
 Detroit Diesel: medium- and heavy-duty powertrain
 TruckStore: used vehicles, financing, leasing, rental, warranty and service contracts, and buyback
 Fleetboard: telematics and Connectivity

Finances 
Of the Daimler Group's total workforce of 298,683 at the end of 2018 (2017: 289,321), 82,953 (2016: 79,483) worked at the Daimler Trucks division, of which 30,447 (2017: 30,424) were employed in Germany and 16,647 in the U.S. (2017: 15,002). In 2019, revenue amounted to €40.2 billion at Daimler Trucks and €4.7 billion at Daimler Buses. Daimler Buses is a leading brand in its core markets of Europe, Mexico, Brazil, and Argentina, selling 30,888 vehicles worldwide in 2019.

In 2018, the most important sales market was the NAFTA countries with 37% followed by Asia with 32%, Western Europe (EU plus Norway and Switzerland) with 17%, and Latin America (excluding the NAFTA country of Mexico) with 7%.

Locations 

Daimler Truck has a worldwide network of production plants and research centers. The following list is a description of all locations worldwide that include a Daimler Truck plant, including plants for the subsidiaries EvoBus, Daimler Trucks North America, Detroit Diesel, Freightliner Trucks and Mitsubishi Fuso Truck and Bus Corporation.

References

External links

 

 
Bus manufacturers of Germany
Companies listed on the Frankfurt Stock Exchange
Multinational companies headquartered in Germany
2019 establishments in Germany
2021 initial public offerings
Companies based in Baden-Württemberg
Automotive companies established in 2019
Automotive companies of Germany
Corporate spin-offs